Panj Hezareh Rural District is a rural district (dehestan) in the Central District of Behshahr County, Mazandaran Province, Iran. At the 2006 census, its population was 3,653, in 839 families. The rural district has 9 villages.

References 

Rural Districts of Mazandaran Province
Behshahr County